Nina Ingela Maria Cromnier (born 14 October 1966) is a Swedish civil engineer and economist. She is director general of the Swedish Radiation Safety Authority . She was director general of the Chemicals Inspectorate.

Life 
She graduated from KTH Royal Institute of Technology, and from Stockholm School of Economics.

In the early 1990s, she worked at the Waste Research Council and the Environmental Protection Agency. In 1995, she joined the Ministry of the Environment; in 2003, she became a ministerial adviser, and head of the Ministry of the Environment's unit for cycles and chemicals.  On 1 September 2010, she took office as Director General of the Chemicals Inspectorate. From 2012 to 2016, she chaired the management board of the European Chemicals Agency.

In 2016, she criticized the European Commission's proposal for scientific criteria to identify and ban endocrine-disrupting substances.  

In 2019, she opened new offices for the  Swedish Radiation Safety Authority . She participated at the 2019 International Atomic Energy Agency conference.

In 2020, she briefed Victoria, Crown Princess of Sweden.

In 2022, she did not see reasons for radiation protection measures in Sweden, in spite of the 2022 Russian invasion of Ukraine.

References 

1966 births
Swedish civil engineers
Living people